Iron metallic discoloration occurred more frequently in the past when soluble iron compounds were used in the treatment of allergic contact and other dermatitis, and in eroded areas iron was sometimes deposited in the skin, like a tattoo.

See also
Skin lesion

References

 
Disturbances of human pigmentation